The 1989 IAAF World Race Walking Cup was held on 27 and 28 May 1989 in the streets of L'Hospitalet de Llobregat, suburb of Barcelona, Catalunya, Spain.

Complete results were published.

Medallists

Results

Men's 20 km

Men's 50 km

Team (men)
The team rankings, named Lugano Trophy, combined the 20 km and 50 km events team results.

Women's 10 km

Team (women)

Participation
The participation of 341 athletes (235 men/106 women) from 33 countries is reported.

 (8/-)
 (8/3)
 (8/4)
 (6/3)
 (7/5)
 (3/5)
 (6/-)
 (9/-)
 (6/4)
 (7/4)
 (8/4)
 (10/5)
 (6/3)
 (3/-)
 (7/4)
 (3/-)
 (5/4)
 (10/5)
 (3/3)
 (4/3)
 (8/3)
 (6/-)
 (6/5)
 (8/3)
 (8/-)
 (10/5)
 (10/5)
 (8/4)
 (8/4)
 (9/5)
 (10/5)
 (8/3)
 (8/5)

See also
 1989 Race Walking Year Ranking

References

External links
IAAF World Race Walking Cup 1961-2006 Facts & Figures - IAAF.org

World Athletics Race Walking Team Championships
Athletics competitions in Catalonia
World Race Walking Cup
Walking Cup
1989
World Race Walking Cup
Athletics in Barcelona